Cychropsis gongga is a species of ground beetle in the subfamily of Carabinae. It was described by Deuve & Vigna Taglianti in 1992.

References

gongga
Beetles described in 1992